The 1984 Oklahoma State Cowboys baseball team represented the Oklahoma State University in the 1984 NCAA Division I baseball season. The Cowboys played their home games at Allie P. Reynolds Stadium. The team was coached by Gary Ward in his 7th year at Oklahoma State.

The Cowboys won the Midwest Regional to advance to the College World Series, where they were defeated by the Cal State Fullerton Titans.

Roster

Schedule

! style="" | Regular Season
|- valign="top" 

|- bgcolor="#ccffcc"
| 1 || February 24 || at  || Wildcat Field • Tucson, Arizona || 10–7 || 1–0 || –
|- bgcolor="#ccffcc"
| 2 || February 25 || at Arizona || Wildcat Field • Tucson, Arizona || 21–13 || 2–0 || –
|- bgcolor="#ccffcc"
| 3 || February 26 || at Arizona || Wildcat Field • Tucson, Arizona || 12–11 || 3–0 || –
|- bgcolor="#ffcccc"
| 4 || February 27 || at Arizona State || Packard Stadium • Tempe, Arizona || 5–9 || 3–1 || –
|- bgcolor="#ffcccc"
| 5 || February 28 || at Arizona State || Packard Stadium • Tempe, Arizona || 0–4 || 3–2 || –
|- bgcolor="#ffcccc"
| 6 || February 29 || at Arizona State || Packard Stadium • Tempe, Arizona || 9–10 || 3–3 || –
|-

|- bgcolor="#ffcccc"
| 7 || March 1 || at  || Unknown • Las Vegas, Nevada || 2–12 || 3–4 || –
|- bgcolor="#ffcccc"
| 8 || March 2 || vs  || Unknown • Las Vegas, Nevada || 4–15 || 3–5 || –
|- bgcolor="#ccffcc"
| 9 || March 3 || vs BYU || Unknown • Las Vegas, Nevada || 8–1 || 4–5 || –
|- bgcolor="#ccffcc"
| 10 || March 4 || at UNLV || Unknown • Las Vegas, Nevada || 16–4 || 5–5 || –
|- bgcolor="#ccffcc"
| 11 || March 5 || at  || Unknown • Edinburg, Texas || 6–4 || 6–5 || –
|- bgcolor="#ffcccc"
| 12 || March 6 || at Texas–Pan American || Unknown • Edinburg, Texas || 4–7 || 6–6 || –
|- bgcolor="#ccffcc"
| 13 || March 7 || vs  || Unknown • Edinburg, Texas || 15–6 || 7–6 || –
|- bgcolor="#ccffcc"
| 14 || March 8 || vs  || Unknown • Edinburg, Texas || 5–1 || 8–6 || –
|- bgcolor="#ccffcc"
| 15 || March 9 || vs  || Unknown • Edinburg, Texas || 10–0 || 9–6 || –
|- bgcolor="#ccffcc"
| 16 || March 10 || vs Morningside || Unknown • Edinburg, Texas || 12–1 || 10–6 || –
|- bgcolor="#ffcccc"
| 17 || March 14 ||  || Allie P. Reynolds Stadium • Stillwater, Oklahoma || 4–6 || 10–7 || –
|- bgcolor="#ccffcc"
| 18 || March 14 || Texas Tech || Allie P. Reynolds Stadium • Stillwater, Oklahoma || 11–0 || 11–7 || –
|- bgcolor="#ccffcc"
| 19 || March 15 || Texas Tech || Allie P. Reynolds Stadium • Stillwater, Oklahoma || 3–2 || 12–7 || –
|- bgcolor="#ccffcc"
| 20 || March 17 ||  || Allie P. Reynolds Stadium • Stillwater, Oklahoma || 9–1 || 13–7 || –
|- bgcolor="#ccffcc"
| 21 || March 17 || Fort Hays State || Allie P. Reynolds Stadium • Stillwater, Oklahoma || 14–0 || 14–7 || –
|- bgcolor="#ccffcc"
| 22 || March 21 ||  || Allie P. Reynolds Stadium • Stillwater, Oklahoma || 8–3 || 15–7 || –
|- bgcolor="#ccffcc"
| 23 || March 21 || North Texas State || Allie P. Reynolds Stadium • Stillwater, Oklahoma || 4–0 || 16–7 || –
|- bgcolor="#ccffcc"
| 24 || March 24 ||  || Allie P. Reynolds Stadium • Stillwater, Oklahoma || 9–1 || 17–7 || 1–0
|- bgcolor="#ccffcc"
| 25 || March 24 || Iowa State || Allie P. Reynolds Stadium • Stillwater, Oklahoma || 7–0 || 18–7 || 2–0
|- bgcolor="#ccffcc"
| 26 || March 25 || Iowa State || Allie P. Reynolds Stadium • Stillwater, Oklahoma || 13–9 || 19–7 || 3–0
|- bgcolor="#ccffcc"
| 27 || March 25 || Iowa State || Allie P. Reynolds Stadium • Stillwater, Oklahoma || 4–3 || 20–7 || 4–0
|- bgcolor="#ccffcc"
| 28 || March 28 || at North Texas State || Mack Park • Denton, Texas || 12–7 || 21–7 || 4–0
|- bgcolor="#ffcccc"
| 29 || March 31 || at  || L. Dale Mitchell Baseball Park • Norman, Oklahoma || 4–5 || 21–8 || 4–1
|-

|- bgcolor="#ffcccc"
| 30 || April 1 || Oklahoma || L. Dale Mitchell Baseball Park • Norman, Oklahoma || 1–2 || 21–9 || 4–2
|- bgcolor="#ccffcc"
| 31 || April 5 ||  || Allie P. Reynolds Stadium • Stillwater, Oklahoma || 7–1 || 22–9 || 4–2
|- bgcolor="#ccffcc"
| 32 || April 7 ||  || Allie P. Reynolds Stadium • Stillwater, Oklahoma || 15–7 || 23–9 || 5–2
|- bgcolor="#ccffcc"
| 33 || April 8 || Kansas State || Allie P. Reynolds Stadium • Stillwater, Oklahoma || 11–3 || 24–9 || 6–2
|- bgcolor="#ccffcc"
| 34 || April 9 || Kansas State || Allie P. Reynolds Stadium • Stillwater, Oklahoma || 7–0 || 25–9 || 7–2
|- bgcolor="#ccffcc"
| 35 || April 10 || Kansas State || Allie P. Reynolds Stadium • Stillwater, Oklahoma || 10–1 || 26–9 || 8–2
|- bgcolor="#ccffcc"
| 36 || April 11 || at  || Jim Wade Stadium • Oklahoma City, Oklahoma || 11–5 || 27–9 || 8–2
|- bgcolor="#ccffcc"
| 37 || April 13 ||  || Allie P. Reynolds Stadium • Stillwater, Oklahoma || 7–2 || 28–9 || 8–2
|- bgcolor="#ccffcc"
| 38 || April 14 || Texas Wesleyan || Allie P. Reynolds Stadium • Stillwater, Oklahoma || 9–6 || 29–9 || 8–2
|- bgcolor="#ccffcc"
| 39 || April 14 || Texas Wesleyan || Allie P. Reynolds Stadium • Stillwater, Oklahoma || 11–3 || 30–9 || 8–2
|- bgcolor="#ffcccc"
| 40 || April 15 || Texas Wesleyan || Allie P. Reynolds Stadium • Stillwater, Oklahoma || 1–11 || 30–10 || 8–2
|- bgcolor="#ccffcc"
| 41 || April 17 || at Oklahoma City || Jim Wade Stadium • Oklahoma City, Oklahoma || 17–12 || 31–10 || 8–2
|- bgcolor="#ccffcc"
| 42 || April 18 ||  || Allie P. Reynolds Stadium • Stillwater, Oklahoma || 21–0 || 32–10 || 8–2
|- bgcolor="#ccffcc"
| 43 || April 18 || Arkansas Tech || Allie P. Reynolds Stadium • Stillwater, Oklahoma || 7–2 || 33–10 || 8–2
|- bgcolor="#ccffcc"
| 44 || April 19 || Arkansas Tech || Allie P. Reynolds Stadium • Stillwater, Oklahoma || 11–6 || 34–10 || 8–2
|- bgcolor="#ccffcc"
| 45 || April 19 || Arkansas Tech || Allie P. Reynolds Stadium • Stillwater, Oklahoma || 7–2 || 35–10 || 8–2
|- bgcolor="#ccffcc"
| 46 || April 24 ||  || Allie P. Reynolds Stadium • Stillwater, Oklahoma || 11–4 || 36–10 || 8–2
|- bgcolor="#ccffcc"
| 47 || April 24 || Missouri Southern || Allie P. Reynolds Stadium • Stillwater, Oklahoma || 6–1 || 37–10 || 8–2
|- bgcolor="#ccffcc"
| 48 || April 28 ||  || Allie P. Reynolds Stadium • Stillwater, Oklahoma || 8–3 || 38–10 || 9–2
|- bgcolor="#ccffcc"
| 49 || April 28 || Kansas || Allie P. Reynolds Stadium • Stillwater, Oklahoma || 7–0 || 39–10 || 10–2
|- bgcolor="#ccffcc"
| 50 || April 29 || Kansas || Allie P. Reynolds Stadium • Stillwater, Oklahoma || 14–10 || 40–10 || 11–2
|- bgcolor="#ccffcc"
| 51 || April 29 || Kansas || Allie P. Reynolds Stadium • Stillwater, Oklahoma || 9–0 || 41–10 || 12–2
|-

|- bgcolor="#ccffcc"
| 52 || May 1 ||  || Allie P. Reynolds Stadium • Stillwater, Oklahoma || 13–2 || 42–10 || 12–2
|- bgcolor="#ccffcc"
| 53 || May 1 || Arkansas–Little Rock || Allie P. Reynolds Stadium • Stillwater, Oklahoma || 5–0 || 43–10 || 12–2
|- bgcolor="#ccffcc"
| 54 || May 2 || Arkansas–Little Rock || Allie P. Reynolds Stadium • Stillwater, Oklahoma || 16–6 || 44–10 || 12–2
|- bgcolor="#ccffcc"
| 55 || May 2 || Arkansas–Little Rock || Allie P. Reynolds Stadium • Stillwater, Oklahoma || 13–6 || 45–10 || 12–2
|- bgcolor="#ccffcc"
| 56 || May 5 || at  || Buck Beltzer Stadium • Lincoln, Nebraska || 11–1 || 46–10 || 13–2
|- bgcolor="#ffcccc"
| 57 || May 5 || at Nebraska || Buck Beltzer Stadium • Lincoln, Nebraska || 0–4 || 46–11 || 13–3
|- bgcolor="#ccffcc"
| 58 || May 6 || at Nebraska || Buck Beltzer Stadium • Lincoln, Nebraska || 5–4 || 47–11 || 14–3
|- bgcolor="#ccffcc"
| 59 || May 6 || at Nebraska || Buck Beltzer Stadium • Lincoln, Nebraska || 3–2 || 48–11 || 15–3
|-

|-
|-
! style="" | Postseason
|- valign="top" 

|- bgcolor="#ccffcc"
| 60 || May 19 || vs  || Unknown • Oklahoma City, Oklahoma || 10–6 || 49–11 || 15–3
|- bgcolor="#ccffcc"
| 61 || May 20 || vs Nebraska || Unknown • Oklahoma City, Oklahoma || 7–3 || 50–11 || 15–3
|- bgcolor="#ccffcc"
| 62 || May 21 || vs Oklahoma || Unknown • Oklahoma City, Oklahoma || 13–4 || 51–11 || 15–3
|-

|- bgcolor="#ccffcc"
| 63 || May 22 ||  || Allie P. Reynolds Stadium • Stillwater, Oklahoma || 15–6 || 52–11 || 15–3
|- bgcolor="#ffcccc"
| 64 || May 22 || Lamar || Allie P. Reynolds Stadium • Stillwater, Oklahoma || 3–6 || 52–12 || 15–3
|- bgcolor="#ccffcc"
| 65 || May 23 || Lamar || Allie P. Reynolds Stadium • Stillwater, Oklahoma || 6–0 || 53–12 || 15–3
|- bgcolor="#ccffcc"
| 66 || May 23 || Lamar || Allie P. Reynolds Stadium • Stillwater, Oklahoma || 14–6 || 54–12 || 15–3
|-

|- bgcolor="#ccffcc"
| 67 || May 24 ||  || Allie P. Reynolds Stadium • Stillwater, Oklahoma || 21–5 || 55–12 || 15–3
|- bgcolor="#ffcccc"
| 68 || May 25 || Oklahoma City || Allie P. Reynolds Stadium • Stillwater, Oklahoma || 2–5 || 55–13 || 15–3
|- bgcolor="#ccffcc"
| 69 || May 26 ||  || Allie P. Reynolds Stadium • Stillwater, Oklahoma || 5–0 || 56–13 || 15–3
|- bgcolor="#ccffcc"
| 70 || May 26 || Oklahoma City || Allie P. Reynolds Stadium • Stillwater, Oklahoma || 11–1 || 57–13 || 15–3
|- bgcolor="#ccffcc"
| 71 || May 28 || Oklahoma City || Allie P. Reynolds Stadium • Stillwater, Oklahoma || 9–4 || 58–13 || 15–3
|-

|- bgcolor="#ccffcc"
| 72 || June 2 || vs  || Johnny Rosenblatt Stadium • Omaha, Nebraska || 9–5 || 59–13 || 15–6
|- bgcolor="#ffcccc"
| 73 || June 5 || vs Arizona State || Johnny Rosenblatt Stadium • Omaha, Nebraska || 12–23 || 59–14 || 15–6
|- bgcolor="#ccffcc"
| 74 || June 6 || vs  || Johnny Rosenblatt Stadium • Omaha, Nebraska || 8–7 || 60–14 || 15–3
|- bgcolor="#ccffcc"
| 75 || June 8 || vs Texas || Johnny Rosenblatt Stadium • Omaha, Nebraska || 18–13 || 61–14 || 15–3
|- bgcolor="#ffcccc"
| 76 || June 9 || vs Cal State Fullerton || Johnny Rosenblatt Stadium • Omaha, Nebraska || 2–10 || 61–15 || 15–3
|-

Awards and honors 
Grant Green
All-Big Eight Conference
Big Eight Conference All-Tournament Team
Second Team All-American American Baseball Coaches Association
Third Team All-American Baseball America
College World Series All-Tournament Team

Pete Incaviglia
All-Big Eight Conference
Big Eight Conference All-Tournament Team
First Team All-American American Baseball Coaches Association
First Team All-American Baseball America
College World Series All-Tournament Team

Gary Kanwisher
Big Eight Conference All-Tournament Team

Dennis Livingston
All-Big Eight Conference

Mike Trapasso
Big Eight Conference All-Tournament Team

Scott Wade
All-Big Eight Conference
Big Eight Conference All-Tournament Team

Randy Whisler
All-Big Eight Conference
College World Series All-Tournament Team

References

Oklahoma State Cowboys baseball seasons
Oklahoma State Cowboys baseball
College World Series seasons
Oklahoma State
Big Eight Conference baseball champion seasons